Midnight at the Well of Souls Role-Playing System is a role-playing game published by TAG Industries in 1985.

Description
Midnight at the Well of Souls is a science-fiction system based on the "Well of Souls" novels by Jack L. Chalker. The game book covers 150 character races, a combat system, starship blueprints, and space combat rules, plus an introductory scenario. The game includes a partial map of the vast Well World, where each terrain hex simulates the conditions on a different alien planet.

Publication history
Midnight at the Well of Souls Role-Playing System was designed by Timothy A. Green, and published by TAG Industries in 1985 as a boxed set containing a 112-page book, a map, and dice.

Reception
Midnight at the Well of Souls was reviewed by Phil Frances in issue 83 of White Dwarf magazine (November 1986). He concludes: "I endeavoured to like this game. Honest. I looked for nice things to say about it, but I couldn't really find any. I can see the intentions behind it, and the designer ought to be commended for his perseverance - few people could ever manage anything like this without being a professional games company. The box makes it sound all very wonderful, but it doesn't seem to amount to much when you've read it - a sort of third-rate Ringworld, actually. Worth buying if you're a rabid Chalker fan, hopelessly rich, or 90% insane."

Reviews
Different Worlds #42 (May/June, 1986)

References

Role-playing games based on novels
Role-playing games introduced in 1985
Science fiction role-playing games